The Directors Guild of America Award for Outstanding Directorial Achievement in Children's Programs is one of the annual Directors Guild of America Awards given by the Directors Guild of America. It was first awarded at the 49th Directors Guild of America Awards in 1997. Before 1996, most children's programs competed in the Drama Show Day category before it retired in 1994.

Winners and nominees

1990s

2000s

2010s

2020s

Programs with multiple nominations
5 nominations
 The Wonderful World of Disney

4 nominations
 Even Stevens
 A Series of Unfortunate Events

3 nominations
 Are You Afraid of the Dark?

2 nominations
 Bear in the Big Blue House
 Gortimer Gibbon's Life on Normal Street
 Goosebumps
 Lincoln Heights
 Saving My Tomorrow
 Sesame Street
 Sports Theater with Shaquille O'Neal

Individuals with multiple awards
7 awards
 Amy Schatz

2 awards
 Paul Hoen
 Kenny Ortega

Individuals with multiple nominations

12 nominations
 Amy Schatz

8 nominations
 Paul Hoen

4 nominations
 Michael Lembeck
 Sean McNamara

3 nominations
 Stuart Gillard
 Dean Israelite
 Jonathan Judge
 Kenny Ortega
 Fred Savage

2 nominations
 Greg Beeman
 Kevin Hooks
 Jeffrey Hornaday
 Jack Jameson
 Mitchell Kriegman
 Stuart Margolin
 Joey Mazzarino
 Ron Oliver
 Brian Robbins
 Barry Sonnenfeld
 Andy Wolk

Total awards by network
 Disney Channel – 8
 HBO – 8
 Nickelodeon – 3
 Showtime – 3
 ABC – 1
 Amazon – 1
 Apple TV+ – 1
 HBO Max – 1
 Netflix – 1

References

External links
 Official DGA website

Directors Guild of America Awards